Baby Baby is a single by Australian indie pop band Ratcat, released in July 1991 as the second single from the band's second studio album, Blind Love.

Track listing
 CD-Single (rooArt 868-145-2) 
 "Baby Baby" - 3:41
 "Cuts & Scratches" - 2:26

Charts
"Baby Baby" debuted at No.23 and peaked at No.21 where it remained for three weeks.

Weekly charts

Release history

References

1991 songs
1991 singles